Terrytoons was an American animation studio in New Rochelle, New York, that produced animated cartoons for theatrical release from 1929 to 1973 (and briefly returned between 1987 and 1996 for television in name only). Terrytoons was founded by Paul Terry, Frank Moser, and Joseph Coffman, and operated out of the "K" Building in downtown New Rochelle. The studio created many cartoon characters including Fanny Zilch, Mighty Mouse, Heckle and Jeckle, Gandy Goose, Sourpuss, Dinky Duck, Little Roquefort, the Terry Bears, Dimwit, and Luno; Terry's pre-existing character Farmer Al Falfa was also featured often in the series.

The "New Terrytoons" period of the late 1950s through the mid-1960s produced such characters as Clint Clobber, Tom Terrific, Deputy Dawg, Hector Heathcote, Hashimoto-san, Sidney the Elephant, Possible Possum, James Hound, Astronut, Sad Cat, The Mighty Heroes, and Sally Sargent.

Ralph Bakshi got his start as an animator, and eventually as a director, at Terrytoons. Terrytoons shorts were originally released to theaters by 20th Century Fox. CBS later purchased the Terrytoons library, which since 2000 is owned by Paramount Pictures.

History

Pre Terrytoons Era 

Terry first worked for Bray Studios in 1916, where he created the Farmer Al Falfa series. He would then make a Farmer Al Falfa short for Edison Pictures, called "Farmer Al Falfa's Wayward Pup" (1917), and some later cartoons were made for Paramount Pictures.

Around 1921, Terry founded the Fables animation studio, named for its Aesop's Film Fables series, in conjunction with the studio of Amedee J. Van Beuren. Fables churned out a Fable cartoon every week for eight years in the 1920s.

In 1928, Van Beuren, anxious to compete with the new phenomenon of talking pictures, released Terry's Dinner Time (released October 1928). Van Beuren then urged Terry to start producing actual sound films, instead of post-synchronizing the cartoons. Terry refused, and Van Beuren fired him in 1929. Almost immediately, Terry and much of his staff started up the Terrytoons studio near his former studio. One staff member during that time was Art Babbitt, who went on to become a well-known Disney animator.

Peak era 
Through much of its history, the studio was considered one of the lowest-quality houses in the field, to the point where Paul Terry noted, "Let Walt Disney be the Tiffany's of the business. I want to be the Woolworth's!"  Terry's studio had the lowest budgets and was among the slowest to adapt to new technologies such as sound (in about 1930) and Technicolor (in 1938). While its graphic style remained remarkably static for decades, it actually followed the sound cartoon trend of the late 1920s and early 1930s very quickly. Background music was entrusted to one man, Philip Scheib, and Terry's refusal to pay royalties for popular songs forced Scheib to compose his own scores.

Paul Terry took pride in producing a new cartoon every other week, regardless of the quality of the films.  Until 1957, screen credits were very sparse, listing only the writer (until 1950, solely John Foster; then Tom Morrison thereafter), director (Terry's three main directors were Connie Rasinski, Eddie Donnelly, and Mannie Davis), and musician (musical director Philip A. Scheib).

Terrytoons' first distributor was Educational Pictures, specialists in short-subject comedies and novelties. Audio-Cinema in the early 1930s backed the production of Terrytoons, and distributed the Educational library internationally, except in the United Kingdom and Ireland where the library was distributed by Educational and Gaumont-British in partnership with the Ideal Film Company.

The Fox Film company (from 1935, 20th Century Fox) then released Educational shorts to theaters in the 1930s, giving the Terry cartoons wide exposure. After 20th Century-Fox withdrew its support from Educational Pictures, the company both backed and distributed Terrytoons. Farmer Al Falfa was Terry's most familiar character in the 1930s; Kiko the Kangaroo was spun off the Farmer Al Falfa series. Most of the other cartoons featured generic animal characters. One of the stock designs was a scruffy dog with a black patch around one eye; Terry ultimately built a series around this character, now known as Puddy the Pup.

Paul Terry may have realized that Educational was in financial trouble because he found another lucrative outlet for his product. In 1938, he arranged to release his older cartoons through home-movie distributor Castle Films. Educational went out of business within the year, but 20th Century Fox continued to release Terrytoons to theaters for the next two decades. With a new emphasis on "star" characters, Terrytoons featured the adventures of Super Mouse (later renamed Mighty Mouse), the talking magpies Heckle and Jeckle, silly Gandy Goose, Dinky Duck, mischievous mouse Little Roquefort, and The Terry Bears.

Despite the artistic drawbacks imposed by Terry's inflexible business policies, Terrytoons was nominated four times for the Academy Award for Animated Short Film: All Out for V in 1942, My Boy, Johnny in 1944, Mighty Mouse in Gypsy Life in 1945, and Sidney's Family Tree in 1958.

Changing hands 
The studio was sold outright by the retiring Paul Terry to CBS in 1955, but 20th Century Fox (TCF) continued distribution. The deal closed the following year in 1956, and it became a division of the CBS Films subsidiary. Later, in 1957 CBS put it under the management of UPA alumnus Gene Deitch, who had to work with even lower budgets.

Deitch's most notable works at the studio were the Tom Terrific cartoon segments for the Captain Kangaroo television show. He also introduced a number of new characters, such as Sidney the Elephant, Gaston Le Crayon, John Doormat, and Clint Clobber.

Before Deitch was fired in 1959, Bill Weiss took complete control of the studio. Under his supervision, Heckle and Jeckle and Mighty Mouse went back into production. Besides the three core directors of the Terry era who were still involved as animators and directors, two Famous Studios stalwarts joined the crew, Dave Tendlar and Martin Taras. Other new theatrical cartoon series included Hector Heathcote, Luno and Hashimoto San. The studio also began producing the Deputy Dawg series for television in 1959. Another television production for the Captain Kangaroo show was The Adventures of Lariat Sam, which was written in part by Gene Wood, who would later become the announcer for several TV gameshows including Family Feud.

Phil Scheib continued as the studio's musical director through the mid-1960s when he was replaced by Jim Timmens and Elliott Lawrence.

The best-known talent at Terrytoons in the 1960s was animator/director/producer Ralph Bakshi, who started with Terrytoons in the 1950s as an opaquer, and eventually helmed the Mighty Heroes series. Bakshi left Terrytoons in 1967 for Paramount's own cartoon studio, which closed its cartoon unit later that year. He would later go on to produce Mighty Mouse: The New Adventures for television in 1987, which was also produced by John Kricfalusi of Ren & Stimpy fame.

Post-history 
After the departure of Bakshi, the studio petered out, and finally closed in 1973. As a result of the FCC banning TV networks from owning cable television and syndication of television programs, CBS created Viacom International to handle all network programs beyond TV production and network broadcasting. On July 4, 1971, Viacom International spun off from CBS; neither Viacom International nor CBS had any interest in Terrytoons. The Terrytoons film library was still regularly re-released to theaters by Fox. The studio's last short was an unsold TV pilot called Sally Sargent, about a 16-year-old girl who is a secret agent. Soon after Sally Sargent was completed, Viacom International ended their relationship with Fox and re-releases ceased. Terrytoons’ existence soon came to an end.

Art Bartsch, who kept the studio running after Bakshi left, would soon die along with Connie Rasinski, and Bob Kuwahara, reducing the studio to a ghost studio with executive producer Bill Weiss and story supervisor Tom Morrison; Viacom kept the studio open until 1972. By October 1972, Viacom International announced that Terrytoons will leave New Rochelle and relocate to Viacom International's office in New York City. By December 29, Viacom sold the now abandoned New Rochelle studio, and the company's fate was forever sealed.

Bill Weiss continued Terrytoons production from his New York City office with the 1970s Terrytoons cartoons (especially Mighty Mouse and Deputy Dawg) being syndicated to many local TV markets, and they were a staple of after-school and Saturday-morning cartoon shows for over three decades, from the 1950s through the 1980s, until the television rights to the library were acquired by USA Network in 1989. However, any new cartoons of the studio's stars came from other studios.

In the late 1970s, Filmation Studios licensed the rights to make a new Mighty Mouse series from Viacom International. Meanwhile, Bakshi would return to Fox in 1977 with his feature-length films, Wizards, followed by Fire and Ice in 1983, a latter collaboration with veteran comic book artist Frank Frazetta. In 1987, Ralph Bakshi produced Mighty Mouse: The New Adventures, which lasted for two seasons. Bakshi and John Kricfalusi inspired the staff to try to get as much Jim Tyer-style drawing in the show as possible. Tyer, a stand-out Terry animator of the original cartoons with a unique style, became a strong influence on the artists of the Bakshi series, such as now recognizable artists and animators—Bruce Timm, Doug Moench, Andrew Stanton, Rich Moore, Lynne Naylor, Jim Reardon, Tom Minton and Bob Jaques. Kricfalusi would later go on to create Ren & Stimpy for Nickelodeon, one of the first of the three animated shows to air on the network to be dubbed as "Nicktoons" (alongside both Doug and Rugrats). That same network would later spawn other famous "Nicktoon" properties such as SpongeBob SquarePants, The Fairly OddParents, Dora the Explorer, Avatar: The Last Airbender, Invader Zim, Hey Arnold!, Jimmy Neutron, and My Life as a Teenage Robot. During that same time, Fox would rebound their success in the animation field—from their line of adult animated television shows such as The Simpsons, Family Guy, Futurama, American Dad!, King of the Hill, Bob's Burgers, and Archer, to their line of theatrical animated franchises such as Ice Age, Rio, Dr. Dolittle, Night at the Museum, Alvin and the Chipmunks, Diary of a Wimpy Kid, Anastasia, Ferngully, and Dragon Ball Z―and by 1994, Fox would sell its Terrytoons theatrical distribution to Paramount, which was then purchased by Viacom that same year, and would go on to purchase CBS five years later in 1999. However, through the years that have followed since the last Terrytoons TV series material in 1988, the rights have been scattered as a result of prior rights issues and the corporate changes involving Viacom and CBS. Since CBS Corporation re-merged with Viacom to form ViacomCBS (Paramount Global as of February 2022), reuniting CBS with Paramount, on December 4, 2019 and CBS Films was folded into the main CBS Entertainment Group after releasing Jexi on the same day, Paramount Pictures now owns the theatrical distribution on behalf of Paramount Animation and CBS Entertainment Group, while CBS Media Ventures (formed in 2006) owns the television distribution on behalf of CBS Eye Animation Productions to the Terrytoons film library. However, some Terrytoons shorts are believed to be in the public domain and have either been issued on low-budget VHS tapes and DVDs or have been uploaded on sites such as Internet Archive. On January 5, 2010, the first official release of any Terrytoons material by CBS DVD was issued in the form of the complete series of Mighty Mouse: The New Adventures.

In 1999, Nickelodeon attempted to revive the Terrytoons characters as part of a TV series called Curbside. Curbside would have been a parody of late-night talk shows with Heckle and Jeckle serving as hosts of the show, along with their assistant Dinky Duck, and would have featured new cartoons featuring Terrytoon characters like Deputy Dawg, Sidney the Elephant, and Mighty Mouse. Curbside features talented voices by Bobcat Goldthwait, Toby Huss, Charlie Adler, Billy West, Dee Bradley Baker, and Rob Paulsen. However, it was never picked up, making it the only Terrytoons show that was never officially released. Between 2001 to 2002, the Terrytoons characters returned to television in original commercials for Brazilian blue cheese (for what is now America's Dairy Farmers) and fine wine. One such commercial was the Mighty Mouse ad (entitled "Dining With Cheese") dining calmly on cheese in a restaurant, utterly unconcerned with a scene of chaos and terror visibly unfolding in the street outside. That said commercial was then pulled from airing following the September 11, 2001 attacks. In 2004, a supposed live-action/animated hybrid Mighty Mouse film adaptation was announced for Nickelodeon Movies and Paramount Pictures, but has been in development hell since then, but development later revived on April 2019 for Paramount Animation with Jon and Erich Hoeber (The Meg, My Spy, and Transformers: Rise of the Beasts) to write the screenplay and Karen Rosenfelt (Alvin and the Chipmunks, Twilight, and Wonder Park) and Robert W. Cort (Bill & Ted's Excellent Adventure, Jumanji, and Terminator Genisys) to produce.

Terrytoons comic books 

Among the many licensed Terrytoons products are comic books, mainly published throughout the 1940s and 1950s. The company's characters — including Mighty Mouse, the magpies Heckle and Jeckle, Dinky Duck, Gandy Goose, and Little Roquefort — were initially licensed to Timely, a predecessor of Marvel Comics, in 1942. St. John Publications took over the license from 1947 to 1956, Pines Comics published Terrytoons comics from 1956 to 1959, Dell Comics made an attempt from 1959 to 1962 (and again later from 1966 to 1967), and finally Western Publishing published Mighty Mouse comics from 1962 all the way up to 1980.

The lead title, Terry-Toons Comics, was published by Timely from Oct. 1942–Aug. 1947. With issue #60 (Sept. 1947), publication of the title was taken over by St. John Publications, which published another 27 issues until issue #86 (May 1951). The series continued in 1951 (with duplicate issues #85-86) as Paul Terry's Comics, publishing another 41 issues until May 1955, when it was canceled with issue #125.

Timely launched the Mighty Mouse series in 1946. The first St. John Terrytoons comic was Mighty Mouse #5 (Aug. 1947), its numbering also taken over from the Timely run. That series eventually ran 71 issues with St. John, moving to Pines for 16 issues from Apr. 1956 to Aug. 1959, to Dell for 12 issues from Oct./Dec. 1959–July/Sept. 1962, and Western for 17 issues from Oct. 1962 to Jan. 1980 (with a hiatus from Sept. 1965 to Mar. 1979), finally ending with issue #172.

St. John's Terrytoons comics include the field's first 3-D comic book, Three Dimension Comics #1 (Sept. 1953 oversize format, Oct. 1953 standard-size reprint), featuring Mighty Mouse. According to Joe Kubert, co-creator with the brothers Norman Maurer and Leonard Maurer, it sold an exceptional 1.2 million copies at 25 cents apiece at a time when comics cost a dime.

Dell Comics published eight issues of a New Terrytoons title from June/Aug. 1960 to March/May 1962.

Terrytoons comic book titles 
 Adventures of Mighty Mouse (18 issues, November 1951 – May 1955) — St. John
 Dinky Duck (19 issues, November 1951 – Summer 1958) — launched by St. John, continued by Pines
 Gandy Goose (4 issues, March 1953 – November 1953) – St. John
 Heckle and Jeckle (32 issues, October 1951 – June 1959) — launched by St. John, continued by Pines
 Heckle and Jeckle (4 issues, November 1962 – August 1963) — Western Publishing
 Heckle and Jeckle (3 issues, May 1966 – 1967) — Dell
 Little Roquefort Comics (10 issues, June 1952 – Summer 1958) — launched by St. John, continued by Pines
 Mighty Mouse / Paul Terry's Mighty Mouse Comics (172 issues, Fall 1946 – January 1980) — launched by Timely; continued by St. John, Pines, Dell, and Western
 Mighty Mouse Album (3 issues, October – December 1952) — St. John
 New Terrytoons (8 issues, June/August 1960 – March/May 1962) — Dell
 Terry Bears Comics / Terrytoons, the Terry Bears (4 issues, June 1952 – Summer 1958) — launched by St. John, continued by Pines
 Terry-Toons Comics / Paul Terry's Comics (125 issues, Oct. 1942 – May 1955) — launched by Timely Comics, continued by St. John
 TerryToons Comics (9 issues, June 1952 – November 1953) — St. John; separate from Terry-Toons Comics / Paul Terry's Comics

Terrytoons staff: 1929–1973 
(Note: Staff members besides the producer, director, writer, and musical director were left uncredited into 1957.)

Producers 
 Paul Terry (1929–1956)
 William M. Weiss (Executive Producer; 1955–1973)
 Frank Schudde (Production Manager; 1942, 1946–1963)

Directors 

 Cosmo Anzilotti (1965–1969)
 Ralph Bakshi (1963, 1965–1967)
 Art Bartsch (1958-1968)
 Mannie Davis (1936–1961)
 Gene Deitch (Supervising Director, 1956–1958)
 Eddie Donnelly (1936–1962)
 John Foster (1937-1938)
  George Gordon (1936–1937)
 Al Kouzel (1957–1969)
 Bob Kuwahara (1959, 1962–1964)
 Frank Moser (1929–1937)
 Connie Rasinski (1937–1965)
 Martin Taras (1959)
 Robert Taylor (1966–1972)
 Dave Tendlar (1959–1971)
 Paul Terry (1929–1938)
 Bill Tytla (1944, 1962)
 Jack Zander (1937)
Volney White (1940-1941)

Writers 

 Joseph Barbera
 Larz Bourne
 Tod Dockstader
 John Foster
 Dick Kinney
 Isadore Klein
 Bob Kuwahara
 Donald McKee
 Tom Morrison
 Al Stahl
 Kin Platt
 Paul Terry
Jack Mercer
Bernie Kahn

Animators 

 Cosmo Anzilotti
 Art Babbitt
 George Bakes
 Ralph Bakshi
 Joseph Barbera
 Vinnie Bell
 Peggy Breese
 George Cannata
 Don Caulfield
 Al Chiarito
 Theron Collier
 Doug Crane
 Mannie Davis
 Ed Donnelly
 Dave Fern
 John Foster
 John Gentilella
  Dan Gordon 
  George Gordon
 Juan Guidi
 Armand Guidi
 T. Hee
 Elizabeth Huntemann
 Isadore Klein
 Bill Kreese
 Frank Little
 Jim Logan
 Frank Moser
 John Paratore
 Ralph Pearson
 Connie Quirk
 Connie Rasinski
 Margaret Roberts
 Jerry Shields
 Larry Silverman
 Milton Stein
 Martin Taras
 Frank Tashlin
 Paul Terry
 Reuben Timmins
 Jim Tyer
 Bill Tytla
 Carlo Vinci
 Jim Whipp
 Gordon Whittier
 Volney White
 George Zaffo
 Jack Zander
 Cy Young
Paul Sommer
Robinson McKee
Vivie Risto
Dan Noonan

Design and background artists 

 Art Bartsch
 Eli Bauer
 Robert Blanchard 
 Anderson Craig
 Bill Hilliker
 W.M. Stevens
 Robert Taylor 
 John Vita 
 George Zaffo 
 John Zago
 Lin Larsen
 Bill Tytla
Charles Thorson

Sound directors 
 George McAvoy 
 Tom Morrison

Voice actors 

 Elvi Allen
 Dayton Allen
 Bern Bennett
 Herschel Bernardi
 Bradley Bolke
 Roy Halee
 Margie Hines
 Betty Jaynes
 Arthur Kay
 Norma MacMillan
 Bob McFadden
 Jo Miller
 Tom Morrison
 Doug Moye
 John Myhers
 Sid Raymond
 Philip A Scheib
 Ken Schoen
 Ned Sparks
 Allen Swift
 Paul Terry
 Lionel Wilson
 Patricia Terry

Musical directors 
 Philip A. Scheib (1930–1973)
 Jim Timmens (1964–1973)

Productions 
 See List of Terrytoons animated shorts for complete filmography

Cartoon series 

 Aesop's Fables (1929-1933) (Inherited from The Van Beuren Corporation)
 Astronut (1964–1971)
 Clint Clobber (1957–1959)
 Deputy Dawg (1960–1964)
 Dimwit (1953–1957)
 Dingbat (1950)
 Dinky Duck (1939–1957)
 Duckwood (1964)
 Fanny Zilch (1933-1938)
 Farmer Al Falfa (1931–1956)
 Foofle (1959–1960)
 Gandy Goose (1938–1955)
 Gaston Le Crayon (1957–1959)
 Good Deed Daily (1955–1956)
 Half Pint (1951)
 Hashimoto (1959–1963)
 Heckle and Jeckle (1946–1966)
 Hector Heathcote (1959–1971)
 James Hound (1966–1967)
 John Doormat (1957–1959)
 Kiko the Kangaroo (1936–1937)
 Little Roquefort (1950–1955)
 Luno The White Stallion (1963–1964)
 Martian Moochers (1966)
 Mighty Mouse (1942–1961)
 Nancy and Sluggo (1942)
 Possible Possum (1965–1971)
 Puddy the Pup (1935–1942)
 Sad Cat (1965–1968)
 Sidney the Elephant (1958–1963)
 The Terry Bears (1951–1956)

TV series 
 Barker Bill's Cartoon Show (1953–1956)
 Mighty Mouse Playhouse (1955–1967)
 CBS Cartoon Theatre (1956)
 The Heckle and Jeckle Show (1956)
 Tom Terrific (1957)
 The Deputy Dawg Show (1959–1964)
 The Adventures of Lariat Sam (1962)
 The Hector Heathcote Show (1963)
 The Astronut Show (1965)
 Mighty Mouse, & The Mighty Heroes (1966–1967)
 Sally Sargent (1968) (pilot)
 The New Adventures of Mighty Mouse and Heckle and Jeckle (1979-1980) (co-produced with Filmation)
 Mighty Mouse: The New Adventures (1987–1988) (co-produced with Bakshi Animation)
 Curbside (1999) (pilot) (co-produced with Nickelodeon Animation Studio)

Appearances in other media 
Many of the characters (such as Mighty Mouse, Heckle and Jeckle, Dinky Duck, Deputy Dawg, and others) were slated to make cameos in the 1988 film Who Framed Roger Rabbit, but only the Timid Pig, Looey Lion, and a character resembling Gandy Goose appeared. They can all be seen during the film's finale. They were also planned to appear in the deleted scene of Marvin Acme's funeral.

References

External links 

 
 
 Post Paul Terry era filmography

 
1929 establishments in New York (state)
1956 mergers and acquisitions
1972 disestablishments in New York (state)
1972 mergers and acquisitions
American animation studios
American companies disestablished in 1972
American companies established in 1929
Companies based in New Rochelle, New York
Mass media companies disestablished in 1972
Defunct companies based in New York (state)
Mass media companies established in 1929
Fox animation
20th Century Studios
20th Century Studios franchises
20th Century Fox animated films
Paramount Global subsidiaries
Paramount Pictures
Paramount Pictures franchises
Paramount Pictures animated films